The following is a list of hospitals in Northern Province, Sri Lanka. Jaffna Teaching Hospital, the biggest government hospital in the province, is controlled by the  central government in Colombo. All other government hospitals in the province are controlled by the provincial government in Jaffna.

Government hospitals

Teaching hospitals
 Jaffna Teaching Hospital, Jaffna District (central government)

District general hospitals
 Kilinochchi District General Hospital, Kilinochchi District
 Mannar District General Hospital, Mannar District
 Mullaitivu District General Hospital, Mullaitivu District
 Vavuniya District General Hospital, Vavuniya District

Base hospitals (type A)
 Point Pedro Base Hospital, Jaffna District
 Tellippalai District Hospital, Jaffna District

Base hospitals (type B)
 Chavakacheri District Hospital, Jaffna District
 Cheddikulam District Hospital, Vavuniya District
 Kayts District Hospital, Jaffna District
 Maankulam Base Hospital, Mullaitivu District

Divisional hospitals (type A)
 Mallavi Peripheral Unit, Mullaitivu District
 Puthukkudiyiruppu Rural Hospital, Mullaitivu District

Divisional hospitals (type B)
 Achchuveli Peripheral Unit, Jaffna District
 Chankanai Peripheral Unit, Jaffna District
 Kopay Peripheral Unit, Jaffna District
 Mulankavil Base Hospital, Kilinochchi District
 Murunkan District Hospital, Mannar District
 Talaimannar District Hospital, Mannar District
 Valvettithurai District Hospital, Jaffna District

Divisional hospitals (type C)
 Adampan District Hospital, Mannar District
 Akkarayankulam Peripheral Unit, Kilinochchi District
 Alaveddy Central Dispensary and Maternity Home, Jaffna District
 Ampan Central Dispensary and Maternity Home, Jaffna District
 Analativu Peripheral Unit, Jaffna District
 Chilavaturai Rural Hospital, Mannar District
 Delft District Hospital, Jaffna District
 Erukkalampiddy Central Dispensary, Mannar District
 Gurunagar Central Dispensary and Maternity Home, Jaffna District
 Karainagar Peripheral Unit, Jaffna District
 Karaveddy Central Dispensary and Maternity Home, Jaffna District
 Kodikamam Central Dispensary and Maternity Home, Jaffna District
 Kondavil Central Dispensary and Maternity Home, Jaffna District
 Mamaduva Central Dispensary and Maternity Home, Vavuniya District
 Mandativu Central Dispensary and Maternity Home, Jaffna District
 Manipay Central Dispensary and Maternity Home, Jaffna District Jaffna District
 Maruthankerney Rural Hospital, Jaffna District
 Nainativu Peripheral Unit, Jaffna District
 Nanaddan Central Dispensary, Mannar District
 Nedunkeni Peripheral Unit, Vavuniya District
 Neriyakulam Central Dispensary and Maternity Home, Vavuniya District
 Pallai Peripheral Unit, Kilinochchi District
 Pandaterippu Rural Hospital, Jaffna District
 Pesalai Peripheral Unit, Mannar District
 Poonakary Peripheral Unit, Kilinochchi District
 Poovarasankulam Central Dispensary and Maternity Home, Vavuniya District
 Pulliyamkulam Central Dispensary and Maternity Home, Vavuniya District
 Pungudutivu District Hospital, Jaffna District
 Sithamparapuram Central Dispensary and Maternity Home, Vavuniya District
 Tharmapuram Central Dispensary and Maternity Home, Kilinochchi District
 Ulukkulam Rural Hospital, Vavuniya District
 Urithipuram Central Dispensary and Maternity Home, Kilinochchi District
 Vaddukoddai Rural Hospital, Jaffna District
 Vankalai Central Dispensary, Mannar District
 Varany Central Dispensary and Maternity Home, Jaffna District
 Velanai Rural Hospital, Jaffna District
 Veravil Central Dispensary and Maternity Home, Kilinochchi District
 Vidattaltivu Rural Hospital, Mannar District
 Voddakachhi Central Dispensary and Maternity Home, Kilinochchi District

Primary medical care units
 Alampil Central Dispensary, Mullaitivu District
 Chunnakam Central Dispensary, Jaffna District
 Elephant Pass Central Dispensary, Kilinochchi District
 Erlalai Central Dispensary, Jaffna District
 Ilavali Central Dispensary, Jaffna District
 Inuvil Central Dispensary, Jaffna District
 Iranaiiluppaikulam Central Dispensary, Mannar District
 Iranaitivu Central Dispensary, Kilinochchi District
 Kaithady Central Dispensary, Jaffna District
 Kankesanthurai Central Dispensary, Jaffna District
 Kokkuvil Central Dispensary, Jaffna District
 Mulliyan Central Dispensary, Jaffna District
 Marichukkaddy Central Dispensary, Mannar District
 Mulliyawalai Central Dispensary and Maternity Home, Mullaitivu District
 Naddankandal Central Dispensary and Maternity Home, Mullaitivu District
 Oddusuddan Central Dispensary, Mullaitivu District
 Omanthai Central Dispensary, Vavuniya District
 Palali Central Dispensary, Jaffna District
 Pavatkulam Central Dispensary and Maternity Home, Vavuniya District
 Periyamadu Central Dispensary, Mannar District
 Periyapandivrichchan Central Dispensary, Mannar District
 Point Pedro Central Dispensary, Jaffna District
 Puttur Central Dispensary, Jaffna District
 Thalpuram Central Dispensary, Jaffna District
 Thirukeetheswaram Central Dispensary, Mannar District
 Thunukkai Central Dispensary, Mullaitivu District
 Uduvil Central Dispensary, Jaffna District
 Urumpirai Central Dispensary, Jaffna District
 Vaddukoddai Central Dispensary, Jaffna District
 Vannerikulam Pass Central Dispensary, Kilinochchi District
 Velakulam Central Dispensary, Mannar District

Special campaign hospitals
 Kankesanthurai Special Campaign Hospital, Jaffna District (located at Kopay Peripheral Unit)

Unclassified
 Mulliyan Central Dispensary, Kilinochchi District
 Palali Central Dispensary, Kilinochchi District

Non-profit hospitals
 Green Memorial Hospital (Jaffna Diocese of the Church of South India)

Private hospitals
New Yarl Hospital
Northern Central Hospital  
 Ruhbins Hospital

See also
 List of hospitals in Sri Lanka

References

 
Northern